Prelude, Fugue and Riffs is a "written-out" jazz-in-concert-hall composition composed by Leonard Bernstein for a jazz ensemble featuring solo clarinet.

The title points to the union of classical music and jazz: Prelude (first movement) and Fugue (second movement) – both baroque forms – are followed immediately without a pause by a series of "riffs" (third movement), which is a jazz term for a repeated and short melodic figure.

It features:
 brass and rhythm in the first movement,
 saxophones in the second movement, and
 the entire ensemble plus solo clarinet in the third movement first with backing from the piano then by the entire ensemble.

Completed in 1949 for Woody Herman's big band as part of a series of commissioned works – that already included Stravinsky's Ebony Concerto – it was never performed by Herman, possibly because his orchestra had disbanded at that time.

Instead, it received its premiere as part of Bernstein's Omnibus television show, The World of Jazz on October 16, 1955. According to some sources the soloist at the premiere was Al Gallodoro; other sources state it was premiered by Benny Goodman – Bernstein's Tanglewood neighbour and friend since the 1940s – to whom the work was dedicated.

In 1952 Bernstein revised the score from its original instrumentation for a more conventional pit orchestra, and the work was then incorporated into a ballet sequence in the first draft of the musical comedy Wonderful Town. The revised version of Prelude, Fugue and Riffs did not survive and the majority of the music was cut from the final version of the Wonderful Town score with the exception of a few phrases in the musical's numbers "Conquering the City" and "Conversation Piece".

It later was transcribed for clarinet and orchestra by Lukas Foss.

Discography

Recordings by Leonard Bernstein
Benny Goodman. Benny Goodman Collector's Edition, CBS MK 42227
Peter Schmidl. Bernstein Conducts Bernstein, Deutsche Grammophon 447952-2 GLB, (1949), (p) 1992

Recording of big band version
Wolfgang Meyer. Homage to Benny Goodman, EMI Classics 7243 5 56652 2 5 (1998), (p) 1998

Recordings available on CD
Michael Collins. The Jazz Album, EMI CDC 7 47991 2
Harmen de Boer. Bernstein/Copland/Gershwin/Stravinsky, Chandos CHAN 9210 (1993), (p) 1993
Benny Goodman. Benny Goodman Collector's Edition, CBS MK 42227
Wolfgang Meyer. Homage to Benny Goodman, EMI Classics 7243 5 56652 2 5 (1998), (p) 1998
Peter Schmidl. Bernstein Conducts Bernstein, Deutsche Grammophon 447952-2 GLB, (1949), (p) 1992
Richard Stoltzman. Copland/Corigliano/Bernstein, RCA Victor Red Seal RD 87762 (1988), (p) 1988
John Bruce Yeh. Stravinsky/Bernstein/Gould/Babin/Shaw, Reference Recordings RR-55CD (1993), (p) 1993

References

External links
 Prelude, Fugue and Riffs, work details
 Score, Boosey & Hawkes
 Prelude, Fugue & Riffs, the newsletter of The Leonard Bernstein Office

Clarinet concertos
Compositions by Leonard Bernstein
Preludes (music)
Fugues
1949 compositions
Music with dedications